Smyków may refer to the following places:
Smyków, Lesser Poland Voivodeship (south Poland)
Smyków, Gmina Daleszyce in Świętokrzyskie Voivodeship (south-central Poland)
Smyków, Gmina Raków in Świętokrzyskie Voivodeship (south-central Poland)
Smyków, Gmina Fałków in Świętokrzyskie Voivodeship (south-central Poland)
Smyków, Gmina Smyków in Świętokrzyskie Voivodeship (south-central Poland)
Smyków, Silesian Voivodeship (south Poland)